Susan D. Parker (born September 30, 1955) is an American Democratic politician from Alabama. A resident of Rogersville, Parker was elected Alabama State Auditor in 1998 and served until 2002.

Birth
Susan Parker was born on September 30, 1955 in Eva, Alabama.

Education
Parker received an AS from Calhoun Community College in 1975(a977), a BS from Athens State College and an MA from the University of Alabama in 1977, and a Ph.D., in Higher Education Administration of Higher Education from the University of Alabama in 1985. She completed a program of alternate studies at Memphis Theological Seminary in 2014.

Professional experience
Parker was an Administrator, Calhoun Community College, 1972–1988, Chief Development Officer/Assistant to the President, Athens State College, 1988–1996, and President, Parker Plus Consulting, 1996–1998, Ordained as a minister by the Cumberland Presbyterian Church, April, 2014, Interim President, Memphis Theological Seminary 2018-2019

Politics
Parker was elected as Alabama State Auditor in 1998. She did not seek reelection in 2002, and was succeeded in office by Republican Beth Chapman.

In 2002 Parker was the first woman in Alabama to be nominated for a Senate seat when she defeated Julian L. McPhillips in the Democratic primary. Commentators drew  attention to the perceived sexism of McPhillips who questioned whether Parker was fit to consider family issues because she had no children of her own. She lost the general election to incumbent Republican Senator Jeff Sessions, winning 40% of votes against Sessions' 59%. In 2003, Parker campaigned for Amendment 1 to the Alabama Constitution, a referendum which proposed, inter alia, new sources of funding for public education, a measure that was defeated at the polls. .

In 2006, Parker defeated former state Representative Perry Hooper Jr., of Montgomery for the Place 2 position on the Alabama Public Service Commission. Though Hooper had defeated former state Senator John Amari of Trussville in the Republican primary, he lost to Parker in the general election.

She had been mentioned as a possible candidate for Lieutenant Governor of Alabama in the 2010 election, but declined and instead lost her reelection bid for the Public Service Commission to Republican Terry L. Dunn.

See also
 United States Senate elections, 2002

References

www.commercialappeal.com/story/opinion/2018/8/11/14
www.dailymemphian.com/article/925/Memphis-Theological-Seminary-battling-budgeet-problems-with-new-president-Susan-Parker-guiding-the-way

External links
 Brief Political Graveyard profile
Commissioner Susan D. Parker at Project Vote Smart
 Alabama's 2000 DNC delegates
 Alabama's 2004 DNC delegates
 (http://www.memphistheologicalseminary.edu

|-

|-

1955 births
Alabama Democrats
Living people
People from Morgan County, Alabama
People from Rogersville, Alabama
State Auditors of Alabama
Women state constitutional officers of Alabama
University of Alabama alumni
Athens State University alumni
21st-century American women